Hydrogen safety covers the safe production, handling and use of hydrogen, particularly hydrogen gas fuel and liquid hydrogen.

Hydrogen possesses the NFPA 704's highest rating of 4 on the flammability scale because it is flammable when mixed even in small amounts with ordinary air; ignition can occur at a volumetric ratio of hydrogen to air as low as 4% due to the oxygen in the air and the simplicity and chemical properties of the reaction.  However, hydrogen has no rating for innate hazard for reactivity or toxicity.  The storage and use of hydrogen poses unique challenges due to its ease of leaking as a gaseous fuel, low-energy ignition, wide range of combustible fuel-air mixtures, buoyancy, and its ability to embrittle metals that must be accounted for to ensure safe operation.

Liquid hydrogen poses additional challenges due to its increased density and the extremely low temperatures needed to keep it in liquid form.  Moreover, its demand and use in industry—as rocket fuel, alternative energy storage source, coolant for electric generators in power stations, a feedstock in industrial and chemical processes including production of ammonia and methanol, etc.—has continued to increase, which has led to the increased importance of considerations of safety protocols in producing, storing, transferring, and using hydrogen.

Prevention 

There are a number of items to consider to help design systems and procedures to avoid accidents when dealing with hydrogen, as one of the primary dangers of hydrogen is that it is extremely flammable.

Inerting and purging

Inerting chambers and purging gas lines are important, standard safety procedures to take when transferring hydrogen.  In order to properly inert or purge, the flammability limits must be taken into account, and hydrogen's are very different from other kinds of gases.  At normal atmospheric pressure it is 4% to 75%, based on the volume percent of hydrogen in oxygen it is 4% to 94%, while the limits of detonability of hydrogen in air are 18.3% to 59% by volume. In fact, these flammability limits can often be more stringent than this, as the turbulence during a fire can cause a deflagration which can create detonation.  For comparison the deflagration limit of gasoline in air is 1.4–7.6%, and of acetylene in air, 2.5–82%.

Therefore, when equipment is open to air before or after a transfer of hydrogen, there are unique conditions to take into consideration that might have otherwise been safe with transferring other kinds of gases.  Incidents have occurred because inerting or purging was not sufficient, or because the introduction of air in the equipment was underestimated (e.g., when adding powders), resulting in an explosion. For this reason, inerting or purging procedures and equipment are often unique to hydrogen, and often the fittings or marking on a hydrogen line should be completely different to ensure that this and other processes are properly followed, as many explosions have happened simply because a hydrogen line was accidentally plugged into a main line or because the hydrogen line was confused with another.

Ignition source management

The minimum ignition energy of hydrogen in air is one of the lowest among known substances at 0.02 mJ, and hydrogen-air mixtures can ignite with 1/10 the effort of igniting gasoline-air mixtures. Because of this, any possible ignition source has to be scrutinized.  Any electrical device, bond, or ground should meet applicable hazardous area classification requirement. Any potential sources (like some ventilation system designs) for static electricity build-up should likewise be minimized, e.g. through antistatic devices.

Hot-work procedures must be robust, comprehensive, and well-enforced; and they should purge and ventilate high-areas and sample the atmosphere before work.  Ceiling-mounted equipment should likewise meet hazardous area requirements (NFPA 497). Finally, rupture discs should not be used as this has been a common ignition source for multiple explosions and fires.  Instead other pressure relief systems such as a relief valve should be used.

Mechanical integrity and reactive chemistry 

There are four main chemical properties to account for when dealing with hydrogen that can come into contact with other materials even in normal atmospheric pressures and temperatures:

 The chemistry of hydrogen is very different from traditional chemicals.  E.g., with oxidation in ambient environments.  And neglecting this unique chemistry has caused issues at some chemical plants. Another aspect to be considered as well is the fact that hydrogen can be generated as a byproduct of a different reaction may have been overlooked, e.g. Zirconium and steam creating a source of hydrogen. This danger can be circumvented somewhat via the use of passive autocatalytic recombiners.
 Another major issue to consider is the chemical compatibility of hydrogen with other common building materials like steel. Because of hydrogen embrittlement, material compatibility with hydrogen is specially considered.
 These considerations can further change because of special reactions at high temperatures.
 The diffusivity of hydrogen is very different from ordinary gases, and therefore gasketing materials have to be chosen carefully.

All four of these factors are considered during the initial design of a system using hydrogen, and is typically accomplished by limiting the contact between susceptible metals and hydrogen, either by spacing, electroplating, surface cleaning, material choice, and quality assurance during manufacturing, welding, and installation.  Otherwise, hydrogen damage can be managed and detected by specialty monitoring equipment.

Leaks and flame detection systems

Locations of hydrogen sources and piping have to be chosen with care.  Since hydrogen is a lighter-than-air gas, it collects under roofs and overhangs, where it forms an explosion hazard.  Many individuals are familiar with protecting plants from heavier-than-air vapors, but are unfamiliar with "looking up", and is therefore of particular note (for example, because of buoyancy, stresses are often pronounced near the top of a large storage tank ).  It can also enter pipes and can follow them to their destinations.  Because of this, hydrogen pipes should be well-labeled and located above other pipes to prevent this occurrence.

Even with proper design, hydrogen leaks can support combustion at very low flow rates, as low as 4 micrograms/s. To this end, detection is important.  Hydrogen sensors allow for rapid detection of hydrogen leaks to ensure that the hydrogen can be vented and the source of the leak tracked down.  Around certain pipes or locations special tapes can be added for hydrogen detection purposes. A traditional method is to add a hydrogen odorant with the gas as is common with natural gas.  In fuel cell applications these odorants can contaminate the fuel cells, but researchers are investigating other methods that might be used for hydrogen detection: tracers, new odorant technology, advanced sensors, and others.

While hydrogen flames can be hard to see with the naked eye (it can have a so-called "invisible flame"), they show up readily on UV/IR flame detectors. More recently Multi IR detectors have been developed, which have even faster detection on hydrogen-flames. This is quite important in fighting hydrogen fires, as the preferred method of fighting a fire is stopping the source of the leak, as in certain cases (namely, cryogenic hydrogen) dousing the source directly with water may cause icing, which in turn may cause a secondary rupture.

Ventilation and flaring

Aside from flammability concerns, in enclosed spaces, hydrogen can also act as an asphyxiant gas. Therefore, one should make sure to have proper ventilation to deal with both issues should they arise, as it is generally safe to simply vent hydrogen into the atmosphere.  However, when placing and designing such ventilation systems, one must keep in mind that hydrogen will tend to accumulate towards the ceilings and peaks of structures, rather than the floor.  Many dangers may be mitigated by the fact that hydrogen rapidly rises and often disperses before ignition.

In certain emergency or maintenance situations, hydrogen can also be flared. For example, a safety feature in some hydrogen-powered vehicles is that they can flare the fuel if the tank is on fire, burning out completely with little damage to the vehicle, in contrast to the expected result in a gasoline-fueled vehicle.

Inventory management and facility spacing

Ideally, no fire or explosion will occur, but the facility should be designed so that if accidental ignition occurs, it will minimize additional damage.  Minimum separation distances between hydrogen storage units should be considered, together with the pressure of said storage units (c.f., NFPA 2 and 55).  Explosion venting should be laid out so that other parts of the facility will not be harmed.  In certain situations, a roof that can be safely blown away from the rest of the structure in an explosion.

Cryogenics

Liquid hydrogen has a slightly different chemistry compared to other cryogenic chemicals, as trace accumulated air can easily contaminate liquid hydrogen and form an unstable mixture with detonative capabilities similar to TNT and other highly explosive materials.  Because of this, liquid hydrogen requires complex storage technology such as the special thermally insulated containers and requires special handling common to all cryogenic substances. This is similar to, but more severe than liquid oxygen.  Even with thermally insulated containers it is difficult to keep such a low temperature, and the hydrogen will gradually leak away. (Typically it will evaporate at a rate of 1% per day).

The main danger with cryogenic hydrogen is what is known as BLEVE (boiling liquid expanding vapor explosion).  Because hydrogen is gaseous in atmospheric conditions, the rapid phase change together with the detonation energy combine to create a more hazardous situation.

Human factors

Along with traditional job safety training, checklists to help prevent commonly skipped steps (e.g., testing high points in the work area) are often implemented, along with instructions on the situational dangers that come inherent to working with hydrogen.

Incidents

Hydrogen codes and standards
Hydrogen codes and standards are codes and standards (RCS) for hydrogen fuel cell vehicles, stationary fuel cell applications and portable fuel cell applications.

Additional to the codes and standards for hydrogen technology products, there are codes and standards for hydrogen safety, for the safe handling of hydrogen and the storage of hydrogen. What follows is a list of some of the major codes and standards regulating hydrogen:

Guidelines 

The current ANSI/AIAA standard for hydrogen safety guidelines is AIAA G-095-2004, Guide to Safety of Hydrogen and Hydrogen Systems. As NASA has been one of the world's largest users of hydrogen, this evolved from NASA's earlier guidelines, NSS 1740.16 (8719.16). These documents cover both the risks posed by hydrogen in its different forms and how to ameliorate them.  NASA also references Safety Standard for Hydrogen and Hydrogen Systems   and the Sourcebook for Hydrogen Applications.

Another organization responsible for hydrogen safety guidelines is the Compressed Gas Association (CGA), which has a number of references of their own covering general hydrogen storage, piping, and venting.

See also
Dissolved gas analysis
Electrical equipment in hazardous areas
Hydrogen economy
Metallic hydrogen
Oxyhydrogen
Passive autocatalytic recombiner
Slush hydrogen

References

External links
Hydrogen and Fuel Cell Safety Report
The International Association for Hydrogen Safety
Higher Educational Programme in Hydrogen Safety Engineering
Knowledge Center for Explosion and Hydrogen Safety

Hydrogen
Safety